The Ababda ( or ) are an Arab or Beja tribe in eastern Egypt and Sudan. Historically, most were Bedouins living in the area between the Nile and the Red Sea, with some settling along the trade route linking Korosko with Abu Hamad. Numerous traveler accounts from the nineteenth century report that some Ababda at that time still spoke Beja or a language of their own, hence many secondary sources consider the Ababda to be a Beja subtribe. Most Ababda now speak Arabic and identify as an Arab tribe from the Hijaz. The Ababda have a total population of over 250,000 people.

Origin and history

Ababda tribal origin narratives identify them as an Arab people from the Hijaz, descended from Zubayr ibn al-Awwam (possibly through his son Abd Allah ibn al-Zubayr) following the Muslim conquest of Egypt.

Many published sources in Western languages identify the Ababda as a subtribe of the Beja, or as descendants of speakers of a Cushitic language.

Language

Arabic

Today, virtually all Ababda communities speak Arabic. There is no oral tradition of having spoken any other language prior to Arabic, in keeping with Ababda Arab origin narratives.

In a 1996 study, Rudolf de Jong found that the Ababda dialect of Arabic was quite similar to that of the Shukriya people of the Sudan, and concluded that it was an extension of the northern Sudanese dialect area.

Alfred von Kremer reported in 1863 that the Ababda had developed an Arabic-based thieves' cant that only they understood.

Ababda or Beja Language

The Ababda may have spoken a dialect of Beja before Arabic, but if so, nothing of that dialect is preserved today. John Lewis Burckhardt reported that in 1813 those Ababda who co-resided with the Bishari tribe spoke Beja.

Alfred von Kremer believed them to be native Beja-speakers and was told that the Ababda were bilingual in Arabic, which they spoke with a heavy accent. Those who resided with the Nubians spoke Kenzi. Robert Hartmann, who visited the country in 1859/60, noted that the vast majority of the Ababda now spoke Arabic. However, in the past they used to speak a Beja dialect that was now, as he was told, solely restricted to a few nomadic families roaming the Eastern Desert. He believed that they abandoned their language in favour of Arabic due to their close contact with other arabophone tribes. The Swedish linguist Herman Almkvist, writing in 1881, counted the Ababda to the Beja and noted that most had discarded the Beja language, supposedly identical to the Bishari dialect, in favour of Arabic, although "quite a lot" were still capable of understanding and even talking Beja. Bishari informants told him that in the past, the Bishari and Ababda were the same people. Joseph Russegger, who visited the country around 1840, noted that the Ababda spoke their own language, although he added that it was heavily mixed with Arabic. He believed it to be a "Nubian Bedouin" language and implied that this language, and the Ababda customs and appearance in general, is similar to that of the Bishari. Traveller Bayard Taylor wrote in 1856 that the Ababda spoke a language different from that of the Bishari, although it "probably sprang from the same original stock." The French Orientalist Eusebe de Salle concluded in 1840, after attending a Beja conversation between Ababda and Bishari, that both understood each other reasonably well, but that the Ababda "definitely" had a language of their own. The physician Carl Benjamin Klunzinger wrote in 1878 that the Ababda would always speak Arabic while conversing with strangers, avoiding to speak their own language which he thought was a mixture of Arabic and Beja.

In the 1820s Eduard Rüppell briefly stated that the Ababda spoke their own, seemingly non-Arabic language. A similar opinion was written by Pierre Trémaux after his journey in Sudan in the late 1840s. At the turn of the 19th century, during the French campaign in Egypt and Syria, the engineer Dubois-Aymé wrote that the Ababda understood Arabic, but still spoke a language of their own. In around 1770 the Scottish traveller James Bruce claimed that they spoke the "Barabra" language, Nubian.

See also
Zubayrids
Beja people
Halaib Triangle

References

African nomads
Arabic-speaking people
Cushitic-speaking peoples
Modern nomads
Blemmyes